This is a list of presidents of the Senate of the Bahamas.
The president is the presiding officer of the Senate of the Bahamas. 
Below is a list of office-holders:

Sources

Politics of the Bahamas
Bahamas, Senateh
Presidents of the SEnate